D100 is a state road in Croatia connecting Porozina ferry port - ferry access to Brestova on the mainland (via Jadrolinija) (D402) and D101 state road to Cres and Mali Lošinj. The road is 81.0 km long.

The road, as well as all other state roads in Croatia, is managed and maintained by Hrvatske ceste, a state-owned company.

Traffic volume 

Traffic is regularly counted and reported by Hrvatske ceste, operator of the road. Substantial variations between annual (AADT) and summer (ASDT) traffic volumes are attributed to the fact that the road carries substantial tourist traffic along Cres and Lošinj.

Road junctions and populated areas

See also
 State roads in Croatia
 Hrvatske ceste
 Jadrolinija

Sources

State roads in Croatia
Transport in Primorje-Gorski Kotar County
Lošinj
Cres